Lt. Gen. Hanut Singh Rathore, PVSM, MVC (6 July 1933 – 10 April 2015) was a General Officer in the Indian Army. He was decorated with the Maha Vir Chakra for his role in the Battle of Basantar in the Indo-Pakistani War of 1971.

Early life 
Hanut Singh was born in Jasol in a Mahecha Rathore Rajput family in Pachpadra, Barmer District, to Lt Col Arjun Singh, who had served in the Jodhpur Lancers, and later commanded the Kachhawa Horse. He attended the Colonel Brown Cambridge School in Dehradun and joined the 1st course of the (jsw) Joint Services Wing.where he was in the Baker squadron.

Military career 
Upon graduating from the Indian Military Academy in December 1952, he chose to join the Armoured Corps, and was commissioned into The Poona Horse.

He did not participate in the Indo-Pakistani War of 1965 as he was posted as the brigade major of the 66th Brigade.

Hanut is widely known for his command of The Poona Horse in the Indo-Pakistani War of 1971, during the Battle of Basantar. For his conduct during the battle, he was awarded the Maha Vir Chakra.

Maha Vir Chakra
The citation for the Maha Vir Chakra reads as follows:

Second Lieutenant Arun Khetarpal, also from Hanut's regiment, was posthumously awarded the Param Vir Chakra for the same battle.

Hanut was promoted to major general on 8 April 1983, and to lieutenant general on 30 December 1985. He subsequently commanded II Corps during Operation Brasstacks, when India almost went to war with Pakistan.

He is the only indian soldier whose bravery and valour was appreciated by Pakistan by giving him the title Fakhr-e-Hind after 1971 war.

Post-retirement 
Upon retirement, he chose to live in Dehradun, dedicating his life to meditation. He died on 11 April 2015. The Indian Army announced plans for the construction of a war memorial in his memory, which will come up in Jasol.

Military Awards

References

Further reading 
Leadership in the Indian Army (Biographies of Twelve Soldiers) by Maj. Gen. V.K.Singh, Sage Publications India Pvt.Ltd.

External links 

Indian generals
Recipients of the Maha Vir Chakra
1933 births
Place of birth missing
2015 deaths
Rajasthani people
People from Barmer district
Military personnel from Rajasthan
Indian military personnel of the Indo-Pakistani War of 1971